This is a timeline of women in library science throughout the world.

1796: Cecilia Cleve became the first female librarian in Sweden.

1852: The first female clerk was hired for the Boston Public Library.

1880: Mary Foy became the first woman head librarian of the Los Angeles Public Library.

1890: Elizabeth Putnam Sohier and Anna Eliot Ticknor became the first women appointed to a United States state library agency—specifically, the Massachusetts Board of Library Commissioners.

1911: Theresa Elmendorf became the first female president of the American Library Association.

1912: Lillian Helena Smith became the first trained children's librarian in Canada.

1921: Alice Dugged Cary served as the first nonprofessional librarian and branch head of the Auburn Branch of the Carnegie Library, the first branch to serve Atlanta's African American citizens under segregation. 

1921: Pura Belpré became the first Puerto Rican librarian to be hired by the New York Public Library System.

1923: Virginia Proctor Powell Florence became the first black woman in the United States to earn a degree in library science. She earned the degree (Bachelor of Library Science) from what is now part of the University of Pittsburgh.

1940: Eliza Atkins Gleason became the first black American to earn a doctorate in library science, which she did at the University of Chicago.

1947: Freda Farrell Waldon became the first president of the Canadian Library Association, and thus, as she was female, its first female president.

1963: Shanti Mishra became the first Nepali female librarian. She was appointed as the chief librarian in Tribhuvan University Central Library, after returning from the United States with a Master of Arts in library science. She was the first female librarian of Tribhuvan University Central Library.

1970: Clara Stanton Jones became the first woman (and the first African American) to serve as director of a major library system in America, as director of the Detroit Public Library.  

1970: The American Library Association's Social Responsibilities Round Table Feminist Task Force (FTF) was founded in 1970 by women who wished to address sexism in libraries and librarianship.

1971: Effie Lee Morris became the first woman and black person to serve as president of the Public Library Association.

1972: Zoia Horn, born in Ukraine, became the first United States librarian to be jailed for refusing to share information as a matter of conscience (and, as she was female, the first female United States librarian to do so.)

1973: Page Ackerman became University Librarian for the University of California, Los Angeles, and thus became the United States' first female librarian of a system as large and complex as UCLA's.

1976: Mary Ronnie became the first female national librarian in the world, due to becoming New Zealand's first female National Librarian.

1976: The Council of the American Library Association passed a "Resolution on Racism and Sexism Awareness" during the ALA's Centennial Conference in Chicago, July 18–24, 1976.

1976: The Committee on the Status of Women in Librarianship (COSWL) of the American Library Association was founded in 1976.

1985: Susan Luévano-Molina became the first female president of REFORMA.

1993: Jennifer Tanfield became the first female Librarian of the House of Commons of the United Kingdom.

1999: Elisabeth Niggemann became the first female director general of the German National Library.

2000: Lynne Brindley was appointed as the first female chief executive of the British Library.

2002: Inez Lynn was appointed as the first female librarian in the London Library's history.

2004: Anjana Chattopadhyay became the first Director of the National Medical Library in India.

2009: Anne Jarvis became the first female librarian in Cambridge University’s 650-year history.

2012: Sonia L'Heureux became the first female Parliamentary Librarian of Canada.

2016:  Laurence Engel became the first female head of the French National Library.

2016: Carla Hayden became the first female Librarian of Congress.

2019: Leslie Weir became the first female Librarian and Archivist of Canada.

References

Society-related timelines
Library science
library
Women librarians